Blennerhassett Middle School is a West Virginia School of Excellence in Parkersburg, West Virginia. Part of Wood County Schools, Blennerhassett serves 550 students in grades 6–8. The principal is Mrs. Melanie Arthur and the Vice Principal is Mrs. Alesha Mendez.

Olympics
Blennerhassett holds a yearly Olympic festival, in which the students are sorted into eight "countries" to compete in academic and sport competitions.

Tri-Star Award
Each year, a few students are honored for their involvement in the school. In order to qualify for this award for involvement, students must participate in the arts (choir, band, theatre, or Student Council), sports, and academic excellence.  Students who win the yearly award for all three years are awarded the "Tri-Star Award".

References

External links
Blennerhassett Junior High School website 
West Virginia Secondary School Activities Commission website

Public middle schools in West Virginia
Schools in Wood County, West Virginia